Pokora is a Polish word meaning humility. 

Pokora may also refer to:

Places
Słupia-Pokora, village in the administrative district of Gmina Słupia, within Skierniewice County, Łódź Voivodeship, in central Poland

People
 M. Pokora (born 1985), real name Matthieu Tota, French singer, songwriter, dancer
 Roman Pokora (1948-2021), Soviet Ukrainian football player
 Timoteus Pokora (1928–1985), Czech sinologist
 Wojciech Pokora (1934–2018), Polish film and television actor

See also